NGC 409 is an elliptical galaxy located in the constellation Sculptor. It was discovered on November 29, 1837 by John Herschel. It was described by Dreyer as "extremely faint, small, round, very small (faint) star near."

See also 
 List of NGC objects (1–1000)

References

External links 
 
 
 SEDS

0409
18371129
Sculptor (constellation)
Elliptical galaxies
Discoveries by John Herschel
004132